The R600A Metox, named after its manufacturer, was a pioneering high-frequency radar warning receiver (RWR) manufactured by a small French company in occupied Paris. It was tuned to receive the  signals used by many British radars of the early and mid-World War II era, notably the ASV Mk. II radar used by RAF Coastal Command to attack U-boats. It is not clear whether the design was German or French or both. It was installed on German U-boats starting in 1942 and used until the end of the war.

From July 1940, the British fitted the RAF Mk II AI (Airborne Interception) radar into Coastal Command aircraft for use as the Mk II "-metre ASV". The radar's known AI weaknesses — problems due to land clutter and inability to determine height, which caused its failure in night fighters — were no handicap in this new role. The radar had a fairly crude display but was able to give the range and an approximate direction within an arc either side of the aircraft heading.

Wing Commander Humphry de Verde Leigh developed the Leigh light, a powerful floodlight steered by the ASV radar,  allowing aircraft to search for U-boats at night. The U-boat was tracked by the radar with the light switched off, following the radar track. Once the returns were lost, the light would be switched on bathing the U-boat in light. The sudden light was often the first indication to the U-boat crew that they had been found. The Leigh light was initially very successful, particularly in the Bay of Biscay. Metox was the German answer to the British radar. Metox sets received the transmitted pulses from the ASV and rendered them as audible beeps. It enjoyed the usual advantage of radar detectors over radar in that the signal is direct and only had to travel one way whereas the radar has to detect the very weak reflection from the submarine. Most radars increase the number of pulses and decrease the width of the pulses when switched to a shorter range, the shorter pulse widths allow the radar to look at closer objects. Radar cannot detect any reflections returned earlier than half a pulse width so when the U-boat was closer than  the operator would change to the shorter scale. If the Metox set started beeping at twice the rate, the U-boat knew that they had been detected. By the time the aircraft was close enough to the U-boat's position to illuminate with the Leigh light, the U-boat was well under the water. As a bonus, the Metox set would also provide warning in excess of visual range in daylight.

In December 1942 British codebreakers regained the ability to decipher messages encrypted with naval Enigma machines and the Germans noticed the resulting increase in U-boat sightings. Based on their confidence in the Enigma machine, as well as the testimony of a captured British bomber pilot, the Germans came to the erroneous conclusion that the Allies could detect emissions produced by the Metox itself.  The executive officer of U-230, Captain Herbert Werner said of Metox, "Then, on August 3 [1943], we received a message from Headquarters which had a greater impact on our lives than any since the beginning of the Allied offensive.
 

Metox was eventually countered by a version of the 10-centimetre H2S radar, which Metox could not detect and once again the Leigh light forced U-boat crews to refuse to run surfaced at night.  Even during the day the new radar was easily able to detect a submerged U-boat's periscope or snorkel, which earlier radars employing longer wavelengths could not do. Metox was superseded by the Naxos receiver that detected  wavelength H2S signals but unable to detect the higher,  frequency of H2X radar developed by the Americans.

References

World War II German electronics
U-boats
World War II German radars
Radar warning receivers
French inventions
Military equipment introduced from 1940 to 1944